Bulnes is one of nine parishes (administrative divisions)  in Cabrales, a municipality within the province and autonomous community of Asturias, in northern Spain. 

Villages
 Bulnes 
 Camarmeña

Transport 

No roads reach Bulnes, however it is served by the Bulnes Funicular from Poncebos.

References

External links 

 

Parishes in Cabrales